Ali Al-Beshari, (born 1962) could be transliterated as Bshari, is a Libyan footballer. He scored three goals in the 1982 African cup of nations in Libya, which made him the tournament's second leading goalscorer (after Ghana's George Alhassan).

He scored for Al-Ahly more than 40 goals, and nine goals for the national team in more than 60 matches.

Links
Ali Al-Beshari at Fifa.com.

Notes

1962 births
People from Benghazi
Libyan footballers
Libya international footballers
Association football defenders
Al-Ahly SC (Benghazi) players
1982 African Cup of Nations players
Living people
Libyan Premier League players